Yu Hai (born 4 June 1987) is a Chinese footballer who currently plays for Shanghai SIPG in the Chinese Super League.

Club career
Yu Hai started his football career with Shaanxi Chanba in the 2004 season and he made his debut for the club on 16 May 2004 in a 2–2 draw against Qingdao Etsong. Despite predominantly playing as a substitute throughout the season, he played a significant part in Shaanxi's third-place finish at the end of the season. By the following 2005 season, he established as a player with rising potential within the team and was starting in considerably more games within the team.

Before the start of the 2006–07 season, Yu transferred to Eredivisie side Vitesse where he would make his debut for the club on 18 March 2007 in a 2–0 loss against FC Utrecht. His time at Vitesse proved unsuccessful as he was unable to establish himself within the team. He was released from Vitesse after the 2008 Summer Olympics due to cruciate ligament damage which he suffered in July 2008.

Yu returned to Shaanxi at the start of the 2009 season where he played 29 league games and scored three goals by the end of the season. For the next few seasons, he became a regular for the club; and by the start of the 2012 season, Yu followed the club when it decided to move to Guizhou and rename themselves Guizhou Renhe.

On 27 February 2015, Yu transferred to fellow Chinese Super League side Shanghai SIPG. He made his debut in a league game and scored his first goal for the club on 7 March 2015 in a 2–1 win against Jiangsu Sainty. By the 2018 Chinese Super League season the Head coach, Vítor Pereira would convert Yu into a left-back, which saw Shanghai SIPG win their first league title.

International career
Yu was a member of the Chinese under-23 national team and was expected to lead the team in the 2008 Summer Olympics; however, he was dropped from the team due to cruciate ligament damage. He eventually graduated to the senior team when he returned to the Chinese Super League and gained regular playing time with Shaanxi Chanba. He made his international debut on 4 June 2009 in a 4–1 loss against Saudi Arabia. Despite the defeat, Yu would go on to establish himself as a regular and be included in the squad that won the 2010 East Asian Football Championship. This would then lead to a call-up for the squad that took part in the 2011 AFC Asian Cup.

On 24 December 2014, Yu was named in China's squad for the 2015 AFC Asian Cup. In the team's opening group match, he scored the winning goal as China won 1–0 against Saudi Arabia.

Career statistics

Club statistics
.

International statistics

International goals

Scores and results list China's goal tally first.

Honours

Club
Guizhou Renhe
Chinese FA Cup: 2013
Chinese FA Super Cup: 2014

Shanghai SIPG
Chinese Super League: 2018
Chinese FA Super Cup: 2019

International
China PR national football team
East Asian Football Championship: 2010

References

External links
 
 
 Player stats at Sohu.com
 Yu Hai Hyves / Fan website

1987 births
Living people
Sportspeople from Luoyang
Association football wingers
Chinese footballers
Footballers from Henan
China international footballers
Chinese expatriate footballers
SBV Vitesse players
Beijing Renhe F.C. players
Shanghai Port F.C. players
Chinese Super League players
2011 AFC Asian Cup players
2015 AFC Asian Cup players
Chinese expatriate sportspeople in the Netherlands
Expatriate footballers in the Netherlands